The Soot Canal was a canal system located in Eidskog Municipality in Innlandet county, Norway. Constructed in 1849, it has Norway's oldest sluice gates. It was the work of Engebret Soot (1786-1859). It was built to allow timber to be transported (floated) to the Halden sawmills.

The Soot Canal was in operation from 1849 to 1932. The channel consisted of the original 16 locks between Skjervangen and Mortskjølungen. In 1987, the municipality of Eidskog acquired rights to the countercurrent sluice system and labeled it a landmark attraction.

References

Other sources

External links
Sootkanalen (Eidskog Museum)

Canals in Norway
Geography of Innlandet
Water transport in Innlandet
Eidskog
Canals opened in 1849
1849 establishments in Norway
1932 disestablishments in Norway